The Vanuatu flying fox or white flying fox (Pteropus anetianus) is a species of flying fox in the family Pteropodidae. It is endemic to Vanuatu.  It is most closely related to the Samoa flying fox.

References

Pteropus
Bats of Oceania
Endemic fauna of Vanuatu
Mammals of Vanuatu
Vulnerable fauna of Oceania
Mammals described in 1870
Taxonomy articles created by Polbot
Taxa named by John Edward Gray